Ginevra King Pirie (November 30, 1898 – December 13, 1980) was an American socialite and heiress. As one of Chicago's "Big Four" debutantes during World , she inspired many characters in the novels and stories of writer F. Scott Fitzgerald; in particular, the character of Daisy Buchanan in The Great Gatsby. A 16-year-old King met an 18-year-old Fitzgerald at a sledding party in St. Paul, Minnesota, and they shared a passionate romance from 1915 to 1917.

Although King was "madly in love" with Fitzgerald, their relationship stagnated when King's family intervened. Her father Charles Garfield King purportedly warned the young writer that "poor boys shouldn't think of marrying rich girls", and he forbade any further courtship of his daughter by Fitzgerald. When their relationship ended, a heartbroken Fitzgerald dropped out of Princeton University and enlisted in the United States Army amid World . While courting his future wife Zelda Sayre and other young women while garrisoned near Montgomery, Alabama, Fitzgerald continued to write King in the hope of rekindling their relationship.

While Fitzgerald served in the army, King's father arranged her marriage to William "Bill" Mitchell, the son of his wealthy business associate John J. Mitchell. An avid polo player and naval aviator, Bill Mitchell would become the director of Texaco, one of the largest and most successful oil companies of the era, and he partly served as the model for Thomas "Tom" Buchanan in The Great Gatsby. Despite King marrying Bill Mitchell and Fitzgerald marrying Zelda Sayre, Fitzgerald remained obsessed with King until his death, and the author "could not think of her without tears coming to his eyes". Fitzgerald scholar Maureen Corrigan notes that Ginevra King, far more so than author's wife Zelda Sayre, became "the love who lodged like an irritant in Fitzgerald's imagination, producing the literary pearl that is Daisy Buchanan". In the mind of Fitzgerald, King became the prototype of the unobtainable, upper-class woman who embodies the elusive American dream.

During her relationship with Fitzgerald, Ginevra wrote a Gatsby-like story which she sent to the young author. In her story, she is trapped in a loveless marriage with a wealthy man yet still pines for Fitzgerald. The lovers are reunited only after Fitzgerald has attained enough money to take her away from her adulterous husband. Fitzgerald kept Ginevra's story with him until his death, and scholars have noted the plot similarities between Ginevra's story and Fitzgerald's novel.

King separated from Mitchell in 1937 after an unhappy marriage. One year later, Fitzgerald attempted to reunite with King when she visited Hollywood in 1938. The reunion proved a disaster due to Fitzgerald's alcoholism, and a disappointed King returned to Chicago. She later married John T. Pirie Jr., a business tycoon and owner of the Chicago department retailer Carson Pirie Scott & Company. She died in 1980 at the age of 82 at her estate in Charleston, South Carolina.

Early life and education 

Born in Chicago in 1898, King was the eldest daughter of socialite Ginevra Fuller (1877–1964) and Chicago stockbroker Charles Garfield King (1874–1945). She had two younger sisters, Marjorie and Barbara. Like her mother and her grandmother, her name derived from Ginevra de' Benci, a 15th-century Florentine aristocratic woman whom Leonardo da Vinci's painted in an eponymous work. Both sides of Ginevra's family were extravagantly wealthy, and they exclusively socialized with the other "old money" families in Chicago such as the Mitchells, Armours, Cudahys, Swifts, McCormicks, Palmers, and Chatfield-Taylors. The privileged children of these prominent Chicago families played together, attended the same private schools, and were expected to endogamously marry within this small social circle.

Raised in luxury at her family's sprawling estate in the racially segregated White Anglo-Saxon Protestant township of Lake Forest, Ginevra enjoyed a carefree "life of tennis, polo ponies, private-school intrigues, and country-club flirtations". Due to her family's immense wealth, the Chicago press obsessively chronicled Ginevra's mundane social activities, and newspaper columnists feted the young Ginevra as one of the city's most socially desirable debutantes. Accordingly, King developed "a clear sense of her family's wealth and position and, from an early age, a highly developed understanding of how social status worked". She only socialized in an elite circle of other wealthy debutantes—self-proclaimed as the "Big Four"—which included her friends Edith Cummings, Courtney Letts, and Margaret Carry:

As a privileged teenager cocooned in a small circle of wealthy Protestant families, King developed a notorious self-centeredness, and she purportedly lacked self-introspection. Intensely competitive, King disliked to lose to anyone at anything—tennis, golf or basketball. This intense competitiveness did not extend to her academic studies. Although she diligently completed her schoolwork, she disliked learning and instead preferred parties where she could sit up late chatting with her Big Four friends. Her closest friend and confidant in the Big Four quartet, Edith Cummings, later became one of the premier amateur golfers during the Jazz Age and served as the model for the character of Jordan Baker in Fitzgerald's 1925 novel The Great Gatsby.

In 1914, King's father sent Ginevra to Middlebury, Connecticut, to attend the Westover School, an exclusive finishing school for the daughters of America's wealthiest families. Her Westover schoolmates included such notable persons as Isabel Stillman Rockefeller of the Rockefeller dynasty, as well as Margaret Livingston Bush and Mary Eleanor Bush, the aunts of President George H. W. Bush. The school overtly prided itself on inculcating a sense of duty and noblesse oblige in its pupils. Most of Westover's attendees later became the wives of wealthy men who sought "fulfillment in social activities, in child-rearing, and, if they wished to, in helping the needy."

Relationship with Fitzgerald 

While visiting her Westover roommate Marie Hersey in St. Paul, Minnesota, a 16-year-old  Ginevra King met an 18-year-old F. Scott Fitzgerald at a sledding party on Summit Avenue on January 4, 1915. At the time, Fitzgerald was a sophomore at Princeton University. According to letters and diary entries, the two teenagers immediately fell in love. Fitzgerald later described this encounter: "It was the sleigh ride he remembered most and kissing her cool cheeks in the straw in one corner while she laughed up at the cold white stars. The couple next to them had their backs turned and he kissed her little neck and her ears and never her lips."

After this encounter in Minnesota, Ginevra returned to Westover in Connecticut, and Fitzgerald returned to Princeton in New Jersey. He deluged Ginevra with correspondence which pleased her as she measured her popularity "in part by which boys wrote to her and how many letters she received". Against his wishes, Ginevra read Fitzgerald's intimate letters aloud to her Westover classmates for their amusement. At one point, Ginevra asked for a photograph of him as she coyly professed to recall only that he had "yellow hair" and "blue eyes".

The lovers corresponded for months, and they exchanged numerous photographs. Over time, their letters became increasingly passionate. Ginevra began having erotic dreams about Scott and "slept with his letters" in the hope "that dreams about him would come in the night". Fitzgerald visited Westover several times, and Ginevra wrote in her diary that she was "madly in love with him". In March 1915, Fitzgerald asked Ginevra to be his date for Princeton's sophomore prom, the most anticipated social event of the year for the young writer, but Ginevra's mother forbade Ginevra to attend as the consort of the middle-class Fitzgerald. Undaunted by this refusal, Fitzgerald secretly visited Ginevra's Lake Forest estate in June 1915 when her parents were not home, and the unchaperoned lovers enjoyed a "midnight frolic".

As the months passed, King and Fitzgerald rendezvoused in different locations, and they discussed—perhaps lightheartedly—eloping. In February-March 1916, Fitzgerald wrote a short story titled "The Perfect Hour" in which he imagined Ginevra and himself blissfully together at last, and he mailed the love story to her by post as a token of his affection. Ginevra read the story aloud to a rival suitor who generously praised Fitzgerald's writing as excellent. 

In response to Fitzgerald's "The Perfect Hour" tale, Ginevra herself wrote a Gatsby-like short story which she sent to Fitzgerald on March 6. In her story, she is trapped in a loveless marriage with a wealthy man yet still pines for Fitzgerald, a former lover from her past. The two lovers are reunited only after Fitzgerald attains enough money to take her away from her adulterous husband. Fitzgerald would keep Ginevra's short story with him until his death, and literary scholars have noted the plot similarities between Ginevra's story and Fitzgerald's work The Great Gatsby.

Despite Fitzgerald's frequent visits and love letters, Ginevra nonetheless continued entertaining other suitors and, on May 22, 1916, Westover School expelled Ginevra for flirting with a crowd of young men from her dormitory window. Mary Robbins Hillard, the stern headmistress of Westover school, declared King to be a "bold, bad hussy" and an "adventuress", a term referring to a woman who ensnares wealthy men in order to increase her social position. After legal threats by Ginevra's imperious and influential father, a cowed Hillard readmitted King to the school, but her father—irate at Westover's treatment of his beloved daughter—decided that she instead would complete her education at a New York finishing school. Ginevra recounted these events in her diary:

Following her expulsion from Westover, Fitzgerald visited Ginevra in June 1916 at her family's Lake Forest villa, and the two lovers enjoyed a "petting party". Two months later, Fitzgerald again visited the King estate, but his reception by her family proved less hospitable. At the time, Lake Forest "was off-limits to Black and Jewish people," and the recurrent appearance of a middle-class Irish Catholic parvenu such as Fitzgerald in the exclusively White Anglo-Saxon Protestant township likely caused a stir.

During this final visit in August 1916, stockbroker Charles Garfield King became irritated by the impoverished Fitzgerald's continued pursuit of his eldest daughter. He allegedly interrogated the 19-year-old Fitzgerald regarding his financial prospects. Disappointed by Fitzgerald's answers, her father forbade any further courtship of his daughter by Fitzgerald, and he instructed Ginevra to drive Fitzgerald to the nearest train station. He purportedly remarked, in a voice loud enough to be overheard by the young Fitzgerald, that "poor boys shouldn't think of marrying rich girls". This line later appeared in both the 1974 and 2013 film adaptations of The Great Gatsby.

Due to her family's intervention, the relationship between Fitzgerald and King stagnated. Their final encounter as a romantic couple occurred in November 1916 at Penn Station when Ginevra visited the Princeton campus for a Princeton-Yale football game. In an interview decades after Fitzgerald's death, King recalled that she was secretly dating a Yale student in New York by this time, and this complicated her meeting with Fitzgerald who was unaware of the rival suitor awaiting her attentions:

By January 1917, echoing her father's earlier opinion of Fitzgerald, Ginevra had discounted the young writer as a suitable match because of his middle-class status and lack of financial prospects. According to scholar James L. W. West, Ginevra scrutinized Fitzgerald "against the backdrop of Lake Forest by that time, as opposed to seeing him at her school," and she realized he "didn't fit in" with the elite social milieu of the wealthy upper-class. A heartbroken Fitzgerald claimed that King rejected his love with "supreme boredom and indifference", and he retroactively viewed Ginevra as a rich socialite who had merely toyed with his sincere affections before casting him aside. In his mind, Ginevra became—much like Daisy Buchanan—one of the "careless" people of privilege who "smashed up things … then retreated back into their money." In the wake of Ginevra's rejection, a distraught Fitzgerald dropped out of Princeton and enlisted in the United States Army amid World .

Arranged marriage to Mitchell 

While stationed as a military officer near Montgomery, Alabama, Fitzgerald continued writing Ginevra and begged in vain to resume their relationship. During this interlude, Ginevra's father arranged her marriage to the son of a business associate as a merger between two elite Chicago families. On July 15, 1918, King wrote to Fitzgerald and informed him of her engagement to polo player and naval aviator William "Bill" Mitchell, the son of banker John J. Mitchell, president of the Illinois Trust & Savings Bank and a friend of Charles Garfield King with whom he shared offices in downtown Chicago. "To say I am the happiest girl on earth would be expressing it mildly", King wrote perfunctorily in her letter to Fitzgerald, "I wish you knew Bill so that you could know how very lucky I am".

According to scholar James L. W. West, "Ginevra's marriage to Bill Mitchell was a dynastic affair very much approved by both sets of parents. In fact Bill's younger brother, Clarence, would marry Ginevra's younger sister Marjorie a few years later." By consenting to marry the son of her father's business associate, Ginevra "made the same choice Daisy Buchanan did, accepting the safe haven of money rather than waiting for a truer love to come along."

Ginevra King married Bill Mitchell at St. Chrysostom's Episcopal Church in Chicago, Illinois, on September 4, 1918. Newspapers lauded the event as one of the most attended weddings of the season. As the arranged marriage occurred amid World War I, a Chicago Tribune columnist described the wedding ceremony as a "war wedding" and heralded the occasion as "the triumph of youth." Newspaper columnists gushed over "the extreme youth of the bridal couple, their gay and gallant air, their uncommon good looks, the distinguished appearance of both sets of parents, the smart frocks and becoming uniforms, all made an impression of something brilliant, charming, and cheerful." The wedding ceremony featured "great garlands of fruit, that Luca della Robbia himself might have designed, [which] outlined the [chapel] arches. The altar, with its wonderful blue reredos was adorned with flowers in blue vases set on a piece of filet lace, rich and rare enough for a royal marriage." After the ceremony, Mitchell's parents hosted a lavish wedding reception at the Blackstone Hotel. 

Although invited by Ginevra to the wedding, Fitzgerald could not attend as he was stationed in Montgomery, Alabama. Instead, Fitzgerald placed the wedding invitation, newspaper clippings reporting the ceremony, and a piece of Ginevra's handkerchief in his scrapbook with the note: "" Three days after Ginevra's marriage, on September 7, 1918, a lonely Fitzgerald professed his affections for Zelda Sayre, a Southern belle whom he had met in Montgomery. A year and a half later, on April 3, 1920, Fitzgerald married Sayre in a simple ceremony at St. Patrick's Cathedral, New York. At the time of their wedding, Fitzgerald later claimed neither he nor Zelda still loved each other, and the early years of their marriage in New York City proved to be a disappointment.

Despite King marrying Bill Mitchell and Fitzgerald marrying Zelda Sayre, Fitzgerald remained obsessed with King until his death, and the author "could not think of her without tears coming to his eyes". Following his failed relationship with Ginevra due to his insufficient wealth, Fitzgerald's attitude towards the upper-class became very embittered, and he later wrote in 1926: "Let me tell you about the very rich. They are different from you and me. They possess and enjoy early, and it does something to them, makes them soft where we are hard, and cynical where we are trustful, in a way that, unless you were born rich, it is very difficult to understand. They think, deep in their hearts, that they are better than we are." For the remainder of his life, Fitzgerald harbored a smoldering resentment towards the wealthy.

King and Mitchell had three children, William, Charles, and Ginevra. Her second son Charles suffered from Down syndrome and required constant care. Ultimately, the arranged marriage between King and Mitchell proved to be unhappy, and the couple ultimately had difficulty residing in the same house together. Despite marital discord, Bill Mitchell rose to become the director of the Continental Illinois National Bank and Texaco, and he partly inspired the character of Tom Buchanan in The Great Gatsby. His brother, banker Jack Mitchell, co-founded United Airlines and married the only daughter of magnate J. Ogden Armour, the second-richest man in the United States after John D. Rockefeller. By 1926, the extended Mitchell family had amassed in excess of $120 million.

Reunion and later years 

By Summer 1937, the arranged marriage between King and Mitchell had effectively dissolved, and the couple were estranged. During this year, King began an extramarital affair with paramour John T. Pirie, Jr., whom she met during an exclusive North Shore fox hunt. Pirie was the heir presumptive to the Chicago department retailer Carson Pirie Scott & Company. During the posh fox hunt, Pirie's horse balked at jumping a fence and hurtled him to the ground in an unconscious heap. Trailing closely behind Pirie on her horse, Ginevra saw him lying motionless on the grass and leapt to the ground. She hovered over Pirie until an ambulance arrived, clambered into the ambulance after him, and stayed with the retail magnate for the remainder of her life.

One year later, in October 1938, Ginevra rendezvoused with a physically ailing Fitzgerald for the last time at the Beverly Wilshire Hotel in Hollywood, California. "She was the first girl I ever loved, and I have faithfully avoided seeing her up to this moment to keep the illusion perfect", an ill Fitzgerald informed his daughter Scottie, shortly before the planned meeting. The reunion between King and Fitzgerald proved a disaster due to the author's uncontrollable alcoholism. Although Fitzgerald had been successfully "on the wagon" for several months, the mere sight of Ginevra ostensibly broke his resolve. After reminiscing over lunch and paying the check, Fitzgerald lingered with Ginevra at the hotel bar. Shortly before Ginevra's departure, the forlorn author began quickly downing double shots of gin. When Ginevra asked if she had inspired any characters in Fitzgerald's second novel The Beautiful and Damned, an inebriated Fitzgerald quipped: "—Which bitch do you think you are?" On this unpleasant note, they parted forever. Fitzgerald used this final meeting as the basis for his 1941 short story (posthumously published), "Three Hours Between Planes". Two years later, the 44-year-old author died of occlusive coronary arteriosclerosis on December 21, 1940.

In 1939, following the death of her 16-year-old disabled son Charles from pneumonia, Ginevra—who already had been living with businessman John T. Pirie—formally divorced Bill Mitchell. After their divorce, Bill Mitchell married heiress Sara Anne Wood, the daughter of General Robert E. Wood who spent three decades as chairman of Sears, Roebuck & Company. In April 1942, King married John T. Pirie, Jr. in a quiet ceremony. Three years later, in September 1945, Ginevra's father Charles Garfield King died at Passavant Hospital in Chicago at the age of 77. By the time of Charles Garfield King's death, the deceased Fitzgerald had experienced a posthumous revival, and the author whom the stockbroker once publicly scorned had become one of the most famous names in America.

In January 1951, Fitzgerald's daughter Scottie sent Ginevra a copy of her letters which the author had kept with him until his death. Reviewing her teenage letters to Fitzgerald, Ginevra commented: "I managed to gag through them, although I was staggering with boredom at myself by the time I was through. Goodness, what a self-centered little ass I was!" King later founded the Ladies Guild of the American Cancer Society. She died in 1980 at the age of 82 at her family's estate in Charleston, South Carolina.

Literary legacy 

Ginevra King exerted a tremendous influence on Fitzgerald's writing, far more so than his wife Zelda Sayre. Decades after their passionate romance, Fitzgerald described Ginevra as "my first girl 18-20 whom I've used over and over [in my writing] and never forgotten". Scholar Maureen Corrigan notes that "because she's the one who got away, Ginevra—even more than Zelda—is the love who lodged like an irritant in Fitzgerald's imagination, producing the literary pearl that is Daisy Buchanan".

In the mind of the author, King became the prototype of the unobtainable, upper-class woman who embodies the elusive American dream. In contrast to earlier American authors who viewed the American dream with considerable optimism, Fitzgerald's literary works such as The Great Gatsby depict the American dream as an illusion since the pursuit of the dream—much like Fitzgerald's pursuit of Ginevra—only results in dissatisfaction for those who chase it, owing to its unattainability.

In addition to Daisy Buchanan in The Great Gatsby (1925), Fitzgerald's literary oeuvre abounds with characters modeled after and inspired by King, including:

 Helen Halcyon in "The Debutante" (1917)
 Isabelle Borgé in This Side of Paradise (1920)
 Kismine Washington in "The Diamond as Big as the Ritz" (1922)
 Judy Jones in "Winter Dreams" (1922)
 Paula Legendre in "The Rich Boy" (1924)
 Josephine Perry in The Basil and Josephine Stories (1928)
 Nancy Holmes in "Three Hours Between Planes" (1941)
 Their meeting in "Babes in the Woods" (1917), from the collection Bernice Bobs Her Hair and Other Stories, was reused in This Side of Paradise.

King is featured in the books  The Perfect Hour: The Romance of F. Scott Fitzgerald and Ginevra King by James L. W. West III and in a fictionalized form in Gatsby's Girl by Caroline Preston. The musical The Pursuit of Persephone tells the story of King's romance with Fitzgerald. She also appears in West of Sunset by Stewart O'Nan, a fictionalized account of Fitzgerald's final years.

See also 
 Edith Cummings, a friend of King's and the inspiration for the character of Jordan Baker
 Big Four, an elite quartet of wealthy debutantes famous in Chicago circa World

References

Notes

Citations

Works cited

External links 

 McKinney, Megan. "The Rich Are Very Different" — Classic Chicago Magazine — April 24, 2016
 Noden, Merrell. "Fitzgerald's First Love" — Princeton Alumni Weekly — November 5, 2003
 Smith, Dinitia. "Love Notes Drenched in Moonlight" — The New York Times — September 8, 2003
 Stevens, Ruth. "Before Zelda, There Was Ginevra" — Princeton Weekly Bulletin — September 7, 2003

1898 births
1980 deaths
People from Chicago
American socialites
American debutantes
American people of English descent
20th-century American women
20th-century American people